Harold Owen "Gary" Wilmot, MBE (born 8 May 1954) is a British singer, actor, comedian, presenter, writer and director who rose to fame as a contestant on New Faces. As a television presenter, he is best known as the host of You and Me, So You Want To Be Top and Showstoppers. His West End credits include Me and My Girl, Chitty Chitty Bang Bang, Dirty Rotten Scoundrels, The Prince of Egypt and Wicked.

Wilmot was appointed Member of the Order of the British Empire (MBE) in the 2018 Birthday Honours for services to drama and charity.

Early life
Wilmot was born in Lambeth, London, into a mixed-race household; his mother was English, and his father, Harry, was Jamaican and arrived in Britain on the Empire Windrush in 1948. Harry was a member of vocal harmony group The Southlanders, but died of a brain tumour in 1961, when his sons were still young. Despite these show business roots, Wilmot's upbringing was outside of the limelight. He worked on building sites and in factories, but soon realised manual labour was not a career he wished to pursue.

Television
Wilmot started his career in entertainment after a friend informed an agent of his talent, and soon began to perform as part of the variety circuit. However, his big break came when he featured as part of a comedy double act with Judy McPhee on New Faces; the pair were later finalists. This would lead to numerous television appearances on Copy Cats, Knees Ups, Cue Gary!, and The Keith Harris Show. One of his most notable television roles was with the BBC children's quiz show So You Want To Be Top, which he co-presented with Leni Harper.

In 1994, Wilmot hosted Showstoppers, a programme which featured him performing songs from musicals alongside special guests. Originally commissioned as a one-off series in which celebrities were given ten days to learn and perform a song, Wilmot was asked to record a further series of six spectaculars due to popular demand. He also starred in and directed a tour of Showstoppers which proved so popular that its original sixty dates were increased to one hundred and sixty.

Theatre
In 1989, Wilmot made a move into musical theatre debuting in the West End production of Me and My Girl, playing the role of Bill Snibson at the Adelphi Theatre. He played the role to critical acclaim for two years, with Jack Tinker describing him as a "Musical Talent of the Highest Order". Wilmot was subsequently nominated in the "Best Actor" category at the Olivier Awards, and theatre tour of a new comedy, Teething Troubles followed.  He was also cast as Joe in Carmen Jones at the Old Vic before starring in the world premiere of the Barry Manilow musical Copacabana at London's Prince of Wales Theatre.

In 2001 Wilmot joined The New Shakespeare Company to play Bottom in A Midsummer Night's Dream at the Open Air Theatre, Regent's Park, and the Pirate King in The Pirates of Penzance national tour with Sue Pollard as Ruth, in 2001-2002. The national tour of Giles Havergal's adaptation of the Graham Greene novel Travels with My Aunt followed. In 2003, he was Caractacus Potts in Chitty Chitty Bang Bang at the London Palladium, taking over from Michael Ball, and returning in 2006 and 2007 on the UK tour. Wilmot also played Billy Flynn in the national touring company of Chicago.

Other stage productions Wilmot has appeared in include H.M.S. Pinafore, Santa Claus the Musical, Oliver!, Half a Sixpence, The Wizard of Oz, The Goodbye Girl, One for the Road, Confusions, Lord Arthur Saville's Crime, and a national tour of the successful Watermill Newbury Theatre production of Radio Times.

Wilmot has recently appeared in Flowers for Mrs Harris at Chichester Festival Theatre, Little Miss Sunshine at the Arcola Theatre, Mr Gum and the Dancing Bear - the Musical! at the National Theatre, London, Jethro in The Prince of Egypt at the Dominion Theatre, The Wizard in Wicked at the Apollo Victoria Theatre and Elisha J. Whitney in Anything Goes at the Barbican Centre in the West End.

Wilmot has also appeared in many pantomimes since 1986. Most recently he has appeared as the dame in the London Palladium pantomimes for Qdos Entertainment such as Dick Whittington (2017), Snow White (2018) and Goldilocks and the Three Bears (2019) co-starring Julian Clary, Paul Zerdin and Nigel Havers.

Music
Wilmot's solo albums include Love Situation, The Album, and Double Standards.

In 1991, Wilmot teamed up with record producer Nigel Wright to record a medley featuring songs from Walt Disney film The Jungle Book. "The Bare Necessities Megamix" was a medley of "I Wanna Be Like You" and "The Bare Necessities", released under Wright's UK Mixmasters name. The record, executive produced by Simon Cowell, reached the top 20, ultimately peaking at number 14. This chart success gave the record a slot on BBC One's Top Of The Pops, with Wilmot featuring in the clip used for the video breakers on the programme originally broadcast on 12 December 1991 but Gary Martin appearing as the vocalist instead of Wilmot, in the studio a week later. In 2004, Wilmot embarked on his own national concert tour My Kind of Music taking him to many major concert venues throughout the country.

Filmography

Theatre

Television

Film

References

External links 
 
 

1954 births
Living people
Black British male comedians
English male singers
English male musical theatre actors
English male voice actors
Black British male actors
Male actors from London
English people of Jamaican descent